Desmond Lim Bak Chuan (born 1967) is a Singaporean politician. He was formerly the president of the opposition Singapore Justice Party (SJP), which joined forces with three other opposition parties (SPP, NSP and PKMS) to form the Singapore Democratic Alliance (SDA) in 2001. He became the SDA secretary-general in 2009 and SDA president in 2011 before stepping down from the position of SDA chairman after the 2020 general election.

Formerly a principal engineer at telco company M1, Lim made his electoral debut in the 2001 general election when he joined a five-member SDA team to contest in Jalan Besar GRC against a five-member team from the governing People's Action Party (PAP). The SDA team lost with 25.51% of the vote against the PAP team's 74.49%. Since then, Lim had contested in all the subsequent general elections (2006, 2011, 2015 and 2020) and one by-election in 2013. He contested with a SDA team in Pasir Ris–Punggol GRC in all the general elections except in 2011, when he contested as a solo SDA candidate in Punggol East SMC, and again in the 2013 by-election. However, he did not win any of those elections.

Lim was initially considered a protégé of Chiam See Tong, the SDA leader from 2001 to 2011, until they had a falling-out, which led to Chiam and the SPP withdrawing from the SDA. Widely seen in opposition circles as a friendly person who is pleasant to talk to, Lim is also known for his willingness to attempt new methods of campaigning and has described himself as "dedicated and determined". When he was campaigning during the 2013 by-election, he was scorned for his poor diction in the videos of his speeches he had posted online.

Background 
Lim holds a Master of Engineering Management from the University of Wollongong, and had been a principal engineer at the teleco company M1.

Political career

2001 general election 
Lim was formerly an assistant secretary-general of the opposition Singapore People's Party (SPP) and president of another opposition party, the Singapore Justice Party (SJP). In 2001, the SJP and SPP joined forces with two other opposition parties, the National Solidarity Party (NSP) and Pertubuhan Kebangsaan Melayu Singapura (PKMS), to form the Singapore Democratic Alliance (SDA). Lim made his electoral debut during the 2011 general election when he joined a five-member SDA team to contest in Jalan Besar GRC against a five-member team from the governing People's Action Party (PAP). The SDA team lost with 25.51% of the vote against the PAP team's 74.49%.

2006 general election 
Lim joined a six-member SDA team contesting in Pasir Ris–Punggol GRC during the 2006 general election against a PAP team led by Defence Minister Teo Chee Hean. At the time, Lim was assistant secretary-general of the SDA. The SDA team lost to the PAP team with 31.3% of the vote against the PAP team's 68.7%.

2011 general election 
Lim became president of the SDA in 2011. Before the general election that year, the NSP and SPP had withdrawn from the SDA. Lim contested as a solo SDA candidate for the first time in that general election in a three-cornered fight in Punggol East SMC. He ultimately lost to the PAP candidate Michael Palmer, who had 54.54% of the vote. Lim's share of the vote, at 4.45%, was significantly lower than that of the other opposition candidate, Lee Li Lian of the Workers' Party, who had 41.01% of the vote. Due to having garnered lower than 12.5% of the vote, Lim forfeited his S$16,000 election deposit under Singapore's electoral rules.

2013 by-election 
In 2013, after PAP Member of Parliament Michael Palmer resigned from the PAP and gave up his parliamentary seat in Punggol East SMC, a by-election was scheduled to be held on 26 January 2013. Lim announced his decision to contest as a SDA candidate in the by-election, which turned out to be a four-cornered fight pitting Lim against three other candidates: Koh Poh Koon of the PAP; Lee Li Lian of the Workers' Party; and Kenneth Jeyaretnam of the Reform Party.

On 21 January 2013, Lim started uploading a series of videos of his speeches, calling it an "online rally" and talking about issues such as the high costs of living and high property prices in Singapore. Although he was mocked for his poor diction, he said he was not disheartened and felt that he should not be judged on his command of English, but on how he could serve the people. It was also reported that some residents admired his "underdog indefatigability".

Lim ultimately lost the by-election, having garnered just 0.57% of the vote, the lowest among the four candidates: Lee won with 54.5% of the vote, while Koh and Jeyaratnam had 43.73% and 1.2% respectively. As he had lower than 12.5% of the vote, Lim forfeited his S$14,500 election deposit, becoming the second candidate in Singaporean electoral history after Harbans Singh to forfeit his election deposit twice. His electoral result of 0.57% was also the lowest any candidate or party got in an election since Singapore gained independence in 1965, beating Teo Kim Hoe's result of 0.81% in 1984.

2015 general election 
Lim joined a six-member SDA team contesting in Pasir Ris–Punggol GRC again during the 2015 general election against the PAP team led by Deputy Prime Minister Teo Chee Hean. The SDA team lost to the PAP team with 27.11% of the vote against the PAP team's 72.89%.

2020 general election 
In 2020, Lim announced that he would be stepping down from his position as SDA chairman after the general election that year. He joined a five-member SDA team to contest in a three-cornered fight in Pasir Ris–Punggol GRC against the PAP team led by Senior Minister Teo Chee Hean and another team from the opposition Peoples Voice led by Lim Tean. The SDA team lost with 23.67% against the PAP team's 64.16%, but did better than the Peoples Voice team's 12.17%.

Personal life 
Lim is married and has a son.

References

1968 births
Living people
Singaporean engineers
Singapore People's Party politicians
Singaporean politicians of Chinese descent